Chester Independent School District is a public school district based in Chester, Texas (USA).

Located in Tyler County, a portion of the district extends into Polk County.

Chester ISD has two school buildings, located on the same campus – Chester High (Grades 6-12) and Chester Elementary (Grades PK-5).

Academic achievement
In 2009, the school district was rated "recognized" by the Texas Education Agency.

Special programs

Athletics
Chester High School plays six-man football.  It played 11-man football until 2010 (and with an enrollment of 68 students was the smallest 11-man program in the state).

See also

List of school districts in Texas

References

External links
Chester ISD

School districts in Tyler County, Texas
School districts in Polk County, Texas